"Applausi" is a 1968 song composed by Claudio Cavallaro and Luciano Beretta and performed by the musical group I Camaleonti.  One of the band's major hits, the song consists of the alternating between soul-style vocal cues and choral moments.

Track listing

 7" single – CBS 3654 
 "Applausi"  (Claudio Cavallaro, Luciano Beretta)
 "Torna Liebelei" (Daniele Pace, Gene Colonnello, Mario Panzeri)

Charts

References

 

1968 singles
1968 songs
Italian songs
Number-one singles in Italy
CBS Records singles